Buttia is a monotypic moth genus in the family Geometridae described by Warren in 1904. Its only species, Buttia noctuodes, was described by the same author in the same year.

References

Ennominae
Monotypic moth genera